George Harrington Lloyd (November 5, 1892 – August 15, 1967) was an American vaudevillian and character actor. Born in Edinburg, Illinois, Lloyd appeared in over 270 films between 1932 and 1956.

Career
In the late 1920s, Lloyd had his own vaudeville troupe.

Lloyd appeared in the Three Stooges short subject Pardon My Clutch (1948) as the angry gas station attendant. He was also Squid McGuffy, café owner, in Crime on Their Hands (1948) and its remake, Hot Ice (1955). Other appearances include  Mississippi (1935), The Return of Jimmy Valentine (1936), High Sierra (1941), Topper Returns (1941) and My Favorite Brunette (1947). In the 1940s-era morality play I Accuse My Parents (parodied by Mystery Science Theater 3000), he was kindly cafe owner Al, "mistaken" by the MST3K crew for Off. Toody (Joe E. Ross) of Car 54, Where Are You?.

Personal
 
Lloyd retired from films as a character actor in 1955. Seven years later, he lost his home after a divorce and was forced to reside in a seedy area of Los Angeles. Lloyd died after a cerebrovascular accident on August 15, 1967. He had been suffering from arteriosclerosis as well at the time of his passing. He is interred at the Los Angeles National Cemetery in West Los Angeles, California.

Partial filmography

 Mississippi (1935)
 Bulldog Edition (1936)
 Wanted! Jane Turner (1936)
 The Magnificent Brute (1936)
 Road Gang (1936)
 Smart Blonde (1937)
 The Case of the Stuttering Bishop (1937)
 Idol of the Crowds (1937)
 Counsel for Crime (1937)
 Thanks for Listening (1937)
 San Quentin (1937) as Convict
 Mr. Wong, Detective (1938)
 Prison Train (1938)
 Devil's Island (1939)
 Behind Prison Gates (1939)
 The Oklahoma Kid (1939) as a Bartender (uncredited)
 They Drive By Night (1940) as Barney (uncredited)
 The Return of Wild Bill (1940)
 She Knew All the Answers (1941)
 Blues in the Night (1941)
 Mokey (1942)
 Hello, Frisco, Hello (1943)
 She Has What It Takes (1943)
 Destination Tokyo (1943)
 San Diego, I Love You (1944)
 I Accuse My Parents (1944)
 The Royal Mounted Rides Again (1945) serial
 The Time, the Place and the Girl (1946) unbilled
 Home in Oklahoma (1946)
 Singapore (1947)
 Swing the Western Way (1947)
 Vigilantes of Boomtown (1947)
 Under California Stars (1948)
 French Leave (1948)
 Bodyhold (1949)
 Death Valley Gunfighter (1949)
 The Pecos Pistol (1949)
 Laramie (1949)

References

External links

1892 births
1967 deaths
20th-century American male actors
American male film actors
Burials at Los Angeles National Cemetery
Male actors from Illinois
People from Christian County, Illinois